Blick's grass rat (Arvicanthis blicki)  is a species of rodent in the family Muridae.
It is found only in Ethiopia.
Its natural habitat is subtropical or tropical high-altitude grassland.
It is threatened by habitat loss.

References
 Lavrenchenko, L. 2004.  Arvicanthis blicki.   2006 IUCN Red List of Threatened Species.   Downloaded on 9 July 2007.

Arvicanthis
Mammals of Ethiopia
Mammals described in 1914
Endemic fauna of Ethiopia
Taxonomy articles created by Polbot